
British NVC community OV5 (Digitaria ischaemum - Erodium cicutarium community) is an open habitat community in the British National Vegetation Classification system. It is one of six arable weed and track-side communities of light, less-fertile acid soils.

It is a very localised community. There are no subcommunities.

Community composition

The following constant species are found in this community:
 Smooth hawk's-beard (Crepis capillaris)
 Smooth finger-grass (Digitaria ischaemum)
 Common couch (Elytrigia repens)
 Common stork's-bill (Erodium cicutarium)
 Dove's-foot crane's-bill (Geranium molle)
 Annual meadow-grass (Poa annua)
 Groundsel (Senecio vulgaris)
 Corn spurrey (Spergula arvensis)
 Common chickweed (Stellaria media)

One rare species is associated with the community:
 Loose silky-bent (Apera spica-venti).

Distribution

This community is confined to a single locality in Surrey.

References

OV05